Miran Kujundžić (born 19 June 1997) is a Serbian professional volleyball player, playing as an outside hitter. He is a member of the Serbia national team, and represented this country at the 2022 World Championship. At the professional club level, he plays for Ślepsk Malow Suwałki.

Career
At the beginning of his senior career, Kujundžić played for Vojvodina Novi Sad in his native country, and has won 3 national league titles in: 2017, 2018 and 2019, as well as one SuperCup in 2014. 

In his first season abroad, he played in France for Tourcoing LM, and in the next two seasons for Paris Volley. 

For the 2022–23, he signed a contract with the Polish PlusLiga team, Ślepsk Malow Suwałki.

Honours

Clubs
 National championships
 2014/2015  Serbian SuperCup, with Vojvodina Novi Sad
 2016/2017  Serbian Championship, with Vojvodina Novi Sad
 2017/2018  Serbian Championship, with Vojvodina Novi Sad
 2018/2019  Serbian Championship, with Vojvodina Novi Sad

References

External links

 
 Player profile at PlusLiga.pl 
 Player profile at Volleybox.net

1997 births
Living people
Sportspeople from Subotica
Serbian men's volleyball players
Serbian expatriate sportspeople in France
Expatriate volleyball players in France
Serbian expatriate sportspeople in Poland
Expatriate volleyball players in Poland
Paris Volley players
Ślepsk Suwałki players
Outside hitters